Piscibacillus halophilus is a Gram-positive, rod-shaped, moderately halophilic and motile bacterium from the genus of Piscibacillus which has been isolated from water from the Howz Soltan Lake in Iran.

References

 

Bacillaceae
Bacteria described in 2009